Pogost Navolochny is a rural locality (a village) in Kargopolsky District, Arkhangelsk Oblast, Russia. The population was 41 as of 2012.

Geography 
Pogost Navolochny is located 34 km north of Kargopol (the district's administrative centre) by road. Nifantovskaya is the nearest rural locality.

References 

Rural localities in Kargopolsky District